Brasil was The Manhattan Transfer's tenth studio album. It was released in 1987 on Atlantic Records.

This album was a new foray for the group into Brazilian music. During the recording sessions, they worked with many songwriters, including Ivan Lins, Milton Nascimento, Djavan and Atlantic Records Jazz recording artist Gilberto Gil. After the initial recording sessions, the songs were re-arranged and then fitted with English lyrics.

Awards 
This album won the Grammy Award for Best Pop Performance by a Duo or Group With Vocals.

Charts
The song "Soul Food To Go" reached #25 on Billboard Magazine's Top Adult Contemporary chart. The stop-motion animated music video for "Soul Food To Go" was produced by Will Vinton Studios.

Track listing
 "Soul Food to Go" (Djavan, Doug Fieger) - 5:08
 "The Zoo Blues" (Djavan, Doug Fieger) - 3:55
 "So You Say" (Djavan, Amanda McBroom) - 4:47
 "Capim" (Djavan) - 4:58
 "Metropolis" (Ivan Lins, Vítor Martins, Brock Walsh) - 4:15
 "Hear the Voices" (Gilberto Gil, Tracy Mann) - 4:06
 "Agua" (Djavan, Brock Walsh) - 5:08
 "The Jungle Pioneer" (Márcio Borges, Milton Nascimento, Brock Walsh) - 3:30
 "Notes from the Underground" (Ivan Lins, Vítor Martins, Brock Walsh) - 5:45

Personnel 
The Manhattan Transfer
 Cheryl Bentyne – vocals, vocal arrangements (3)
 Tim Hauser – vocals
 Alan Paul – vocals, vocal arrangements (2, 4, 5)
 Janis Siegel – vocals, vocal arrangements (1, 3, 4, 6-9)

Musicians and Guests
 Jeff Lorber – keyboards (1, 2, 3, 5), synthesizer programming (1, 2, 3, 5), arrangements (1, 2, 3, 5)
 Larry Williams – keyboards (4, 6, 7, 9), synthesizer programming (4, 6, 7, 9), arrangements (4, 6, 7, 9)
 Yaron Gershovsky – acoustic piano (5)
 Wagner Tiso – synthesizer  programming (8), arrangements (8)
 Wayne Johnson – guitar (1, 5)
 Dann Huff – guitar (3, 7)
 Toninho Horta – guitar (4, 6, 8)
 Oscar Castro-Neves – guitar (4, 9)
 Victor Biglione – guitar (8)
 Abraham Laboriel – bass (4, 6)
 Nathan East – bass (5, 7)
 Jamal Joanes Dos Santos – bass (8)
 Buddy Williams – drums (1)
 John Robinson – drums (3, 4, 7, 8)
 Djalma Correa – percussion (1, 6)
 Paulinho da Costa – percussion (2, 4, 5, 9)
 Frank Colón – percussion (8)
 David Sanborn – alto saxophone solo (3)
 Stan Getz – tenor saxophone solo (4)
 Djavan – guest vocals (1, 4)
 Milton Nascimento – guest vocals (8)
 Uakti (Paulo Sergio Dos Santos, Marco Antonio Guimaraes, Decio De Souza Ramos and Artur Andres Riberto) – soloists (7, 9); Arranged by Marco Antonio Guimaraes

Production 
 Producers – Tim Hauser (Tracks 1–7 & 9); Tim Hauser and Mazzola (Track 8).
 Executive Producer on Brazilian sessions – Alberto Traiger
 Recorded by Ed Thacker
 Second Engineers – Carlos Ronconi and Mike Ross
 Vocal Engineer – Keith Cohen
 Second Vocal Engineer – Ted Blaisdell
 Mixed by Brian Malouf
 Second Mixing Engineers – Jim Dineen and Clif Jones
 Recorded at Ocean Way Recording, Studio 55 and Skip Saylor Recording (Los Angeles, CA); Bill Schnee Studios and The Grey Room (Hollywood, CA); JHL Studios (Pacific Palisades, CA); Som Livre Studios (Rio de Janeiro, Brazil).
 Mastered by Stephen Marcussen at Precision Mastering (Hollywood, CA).
 Album Coordination – Marsha Loeb
 Project Coordination – Ivy Skoff
 Art Direction, Design and Paintings – Fayette Hauser
 Back Cover Photography – Lawrence Manning
 Sleeve Photography – Nancy Clendaniel, John Cutcliffe, Fayette Hauser, Tim Hauser, Lawrence Manning and Louise Velasquez.

Certifications

References / Sources
 The Manhattan Transfer Official Website

Specific

The Manhattan Transfer albums
1987 albums
Atlantic Records albums